Crow Hill, also known as Charles Whiting Residence, is a historic home located at Kinderhook in Columbia County, New York.  It was built in 1839 and is a -story, nearly square and symmetrical, wood-frame dwelling with clapboard siding in the Greek Revival style.  It has a hipped roof with cupola centered over the main hall.  It was framed with recycled parts of old barns and perhaps earlier homes.  Also on the property is a 19th-century wood well house.

It was added to the National Register of Historic Places in 1997.

References

Houses on the National Register of Historic Places in New York (state)
Houses in Columbia County, New York
National Register of Historic Places in Columbia County, New York